Castañeira is a village in the municipality of Balboa in El Bierzo, province of province of León, Autonomous Community of Castilla y León, Spain. It is located almost in the Port of Portelo, and it is the last village before entering El Bierzo in the province of Lugo. The nearest towns are comeal (uninhabited), Parajís (1.4 km) and Villanueva (Balboa) (1.4 km).

Castañeira was known as a legend (like many similar El Bierzo) that spoke of a "golden yoke" buried nearby, related to Moors and treasures (the Moors were not such, but a kind of legendary beings) and where they lived, "the Curtain the Mouro"

Municipalities in El Bierzo